Kolleru is a village in West Godavari district in the state of Andhra Pradesh in India.

Demographics
 India census, Kolleru has a population of 154 of which 76 are males while 78 are females. The average sex ratio of Kolleru village is 1026. The child population is 14, which makes up 9.09% of the total population of the village, with sex ratio 890, significantly higher than state average. In 2011, the literacy rate of Kolleru village was 52.14% when compared to 67.02% of Andhra Pradesh.

See also 
 West Godavari district

References 

Villages in West Godavari district